This is a list of seasons completed by the Tennessee Titans, an American football franchise of the National Football League (NFL). The list documents the season-by-season records of the Titans' franchise from 1960 to the present, including postseason records and league awards for individual players or head coaches. The Titans were originally known as the Houston Oilers and were a part of the inaugural season of the American Football League (AFL) in 1960. In 1997, the franchise moved to Tennessee, playing in Memphis temporarily until settling in Nashville. The team was rebranded as the Titans following the 1998 season. The Titans have yet to win a Super Bowl, falling one yard short in their only appearance in Super Bowl XXXIV, although the team does have two championships from its early years in the AFL. During their tenure in Tennessee they have defeated all 31 other franchises at least once, enjoying a perfect record against the Detroit Lions (5-0).

Seasons

^^ = Due to a strike-shortened season in 1982, all teams were ranked by conference instead of division.

All-time records

See also
 History of the Tennessee Titans
 History of the Houston Oilers

 

 
Tennessee Titans
Seasons
seasons